Club Deportivo Villacañas is a Spanish football team based in Villacañas, in the autonomous community of Castile-La Mancha. Founded in 1998, it plays in Tercera División, holding home matches at Campo Municipal de Fútbol de Las Pirámides.

Season to season

13 seasons in Tercera División

References

External links
ArefePedia profile 
La Preferente team profile 
Soccerway team profile

Football clubs in Castilla–La Mancha
Association football clubs established in 1998
1998 establishments in Spain